Bass Bumpers are a German DJ and record production team, known for their Eurodance/techno music. They are originally from Germany, with members Henning Reith, Caba Kroll, CJ Stone, George Dee, Akira Yamamoto, and Reinhard "DJ Voodoo" Raith. They produced their own hits such as "Good Fun", "The Music's Got Me" (a number 36 hit on Billboard's Hot Dance Club Songs chart in 1992), "Move to the Rhythm" and "Rhythm Is a Dancer (2003)" with Snap!. Perhaps their biggest success was when they created Crazy Frog's remake of the popular hit "Axel F" from Beverly Hills Cop. This was a song credited to Crazy Frog, which peaked at number 1 in the UK on 31 May 2005.

In 1992, they also produced some songs for "Cadavrexquis" 's album of Amanda Lear.

Their own tracks, "The Music's Got Me" (1992) and "Runnin (1993) were minor hits in the UK Singles Chart. The group also had a UK hit single in 2006 with a mash-up of "Phat Planet" by Leftfield and the Baywatch theme tune (as performed on the TV show's credits by Survivor vocalist Jimi Jamison as "I'm Always Here"). This new version was entitled "Phat Beach (I'll Be Ready)", with the group being credited as Naughty Boy (four years before British record producer Shahid Khan has a hit in the UK charts under that name.

In 2015, the group released "The Music's Got Me" with new mixes from North2South, La Chord, and Taito Tikaro.

Discography

Albums
 1992: Advance

 1993: Recouped Advance
 1995: The Best of
 2004: Dance History

Singles

References

Creation Records artists
German dance music groups
German Eurodance groups
German DJs
Electronic dance music groups